Clube Atlético Vila Rica, commonly known as Vila Rica, is a Brazilian football club based in Belém, Pará state.

History
The club was founded on June 27, 1987. Vila Rica won the Campeonato Paraense Second Level in 1995, 2001, 2007. They competed in the Série B for the first time in 1971, when they were eliminated in the First Stage, and in 1986, when they were again eliminated in the First Stage.

Achievements

 Campeonato Paraense Second Level:
 Winners (1): 1995, 2001, 2007

Stadium

Clube Atlético Vila Rica play their home games at Estádio Olímpico do Pará, nicknamed Mangueirão. The stadium has a maximum capacity of 45,007 people.

References

Association football clubs established in 1987
Football clubs in Pará
1987 establishments in Brazil